Roy Alfred Williams  (born 9 September 1934) is a former track and field athlete from New Zealand, who won gold in the decathlon at the 1966 Empire and Commonwealth Games in Kingston, but was overlooked for the 1956, 1960 and 1964 Olympic Games (in 1964 he was in training in California, and was not seen by the selectors).

He also competed in the 1958 British Empire and Commonwealth Games at Cardiff in the long jump and triple jump, and in the 1970 British Commonwealth Games at Edinburgh in the decathlon.

He won the national decathlon title 11 times between 1956 and 1970, as well as the 120 yards hurdles title in 1965, the long jump title in 1958 and the discus title in 1956.

He is a (younger) brother of Yvette Williams.

He was inducted into the New Zealand Sports Hall of Fame in 1990. In the 2002 New Year Honours, Williams was appointed a Member of the New Zealand Order of Merit, for services to athletics.

References 

 Profiles of Fame: The stories of New Zealand’s Greatest Sporting Achievers by Ron Palenski (2002, New Zealand Sports Hall of Fame, Dunedin) p. 51 
 Page with Photo at Sporting Heroes

External links
 

1934 births
Living people
Commonwealth Games gold medallists for New Zealand
Athletes (track and field) at the 1958 British Empire and Commonwealth Games
Athletes (track and field) at the 1966 British Empire and Commonwealth Games
Athletes (track and field) at the 1970 British Commonwealth Games
Commonwealth Games medallists in athletics
New Zealand decathletes
New Zealand male long jumpers
New Zealand male triple jumpers
Members of the New Zealand Order of Merit
Medallists at the 1966 British Empire and Commonwealth Games